Chrysothemis is a name ascribed to several characters in Greek mythology.

Chrysothemis may also refer to:
Chrysothemis (plant), a genus of plants in the family Gesneriaceae
637 Chrysothemis, a minor planet
Chrysothemis, a descendant of Perseus